Robert E. Whitehead (born 1950) is the former US Chargé d'Affaires in Gabon, as well as Ambassador to the Togolese Republic (2012–2015) and Chief of Mission in Khartoum, Sudan (until July 2011 when the Republic of South Sudan became an independent country). He served as the first American Consul-General to Juba, South Sudan in 2006.

Biography
Whitehead graduated from Taylor University (1972) and earned an M.A. in English Literature and linguistics from Southern Illinois University Carbondale, where he was a graduate fellow.,

Career
After 33 years in the Foreign Service, Whitehead retired in 2015. Since then, he's been called back several times to serve as Chargé d'Affaires at the  Embassy in Burundi (2016), six months as Chargé d'Affaires at the Embassy in Kinshasa (2017) and four months as Counselor at the Embassy in Bangui, Central African Republic (2018).  He served as Chargé d'Affaires in São Tomé and Príncipe in 2019.

See also
List of current ambassadors of the United States

References

Living people
People from Crawfordsville, Indiana
Southern Illinois University Carbondale alumni
Taylor University alumni
Ambassadors of the United States to Gabon
Ambassadors of the United States to Togo
American consuls
United States Foreign Service personnel
Ambassadors of the United States to Burundi
Ambassadors of the United States to the Democratic Republic of the Congo
Ambassadors of the United States to São Tomé and Príncipe
21st-century American diplomats
1950 births